Taylor Pass is a mountain pass in the Chilcotin Ranges of the Coast Mountains of British Columbia, Canada, located at the divide between the headwaters of the Taseko River and those of Gun Creek, a tributary of the Bridge River.

See also
List of mountain passes
Spruce Lake Protected Area
Tsy'los Provincial Park

References

Mountain passes of British Columbia
Chilcotin Ranges
Landforms of the Chilcotin
Bridge River Country